There are two different kinds of archery records in Malaysia and certified by the National Archery Association of Malaysia (NAAM):
 National record, more commonly referred to in Malaysia as the rekod kebangsaan: the best score recorded anywhere in the world by an archer or team holding Malaysian citizenship.
 Malaysian All-Comers record: the best score recorded within Malaysia by an archer or team regardless of nationality.
Key to tables:

Legend: # – Record awaiting ratification by National Archery Association of Malaysia; WR – World record; AS – Asian record; CR – Commonwealth record

Current Malaysian national records

Men

Women

Current Malaysian All-Comers records

Men

Women

See also
List of Sukma records in archery

References

External links
 List of Malaysian records in archery as of 23 July 2016
 List of Sukan Malaysia records in archery as of 23 July 2016

Archery in Malaysia
Malaysia
Archery
Archery